Science Hill may refer to:

Places
Science Hill, an area of the Yale University campus
Science Hill, Kentucky
Science Hill (New York)
Science Hill, Ontario

Schools
Science Hill High School in Johnson City, Tennessee
Science Hill School (Shelbyville, Kentucky), listed on the National Register of Historic Places in Shelby County, Kentucky
Science Hill School (Alliance, Ohio), listed on the National Register of Historic Places in Stark County, Ohio